Anthony John Clark (born 7 April 1977) is an English former professional footballer who played as a forward for Wycombe Wanderers in the Football League.

References

1977 births
Living people
Footballers from Lambeth
English footballers
Association football forwards
Wycombe Wanderers F.C. players
Newport Pagnell Town F.C. players
Hendon F.C. players
Buckingham Town F.C. players
English Football League players